Winawer is a surname. Notable people with the surname include:

Szymon Winawer (1838–1919), Polish chess player
Bruno Winawer (1883–1944), Polish columnist, comedy writer, and physicist
Melodie Winawer, American neurologist

See also
 Vinaver